The Group of Eight + Five (G8+5) was an international group that consisted of the leaders of the heads of government from the G8 nations (Canada, France, Germany, Italy, Japan, Russia, the United Kingdom, and the United States), plus the heads of government of the five leading emerging economies (Brazil, China, India, Mexico, and South Africa). In March 2014, Russia was cast out of the Group of 8 due to its involvement in the 2014 Crimea crisis in Ukraine, so the G8+5 in its original form is unlikely to reconvene with Russia present.

February 2007 declaration

On February 16, 2007, The Global Legislators Organisation (GLOBE International) held a meeting of the G8+5 Climate Change Dialogue at the GLOBE Washington Legislators Forum in Washington, D.C., where a non-binding agreement was reached to cooperate on tackling global warming. The group accepted that the existence of man-made climate change was beyond doubt, and that there should be a global system of emission caps and carbon emissions trading applying to both industrialized nations and developing countries. The group hoped this policy to be in place by 2009, to supersede the Kyoto Protocol, the first phase of which expires in 2012.

Foundation
The G8+5 group was formed in 2005 when Tony Blair, then Prime Minister of the United Kingdom, in his role as host of the 31st G8 summit at Gleneagles, Scotland, invited the leading emerging countries to join the talks. The hope was that this would form a stronger and more representative group that would inject fresh impetus into the trade talks at Doha, and the need to achieve a deeper cooperation on climate change.

Following the meeting, the countries issued a joint statement looking to build a "new paradigm for international cooperation" in the future.

The G8+5 Climate Change Dialogue was launched on February 24, 2006, by the (GLOBE) in partnership with the Com+ alliance of communicators for sustainable development.

Institutionalization
Following the 33rd G8 summit Heiligendamm 2007, German chancellor Angela Merkel announced the establishment of the "Heiligendamm Process" through which the full institutionalization of the permanent dialogue between the G8 countries and the five greatest emerging economies will be implemented. This will include the establishment of a common G8 and G5 platform at the OECD.

Most recently on August 28, 2007, former French president Nicolas Sarkozy in a foreign policy statement proposed that Brazil, China, India, Mexico and South Africa should become members of G8: "The G8 can't meet for two days and the G13 for just two hours.... That doesn't seem fitting, given the power of these five emerging countries." Nevertheless, as of 2008, a formal enlargement of the G8 is not a realistic political option, since the G8 member states have diverging positions on this issue. The United States and Japan have been against enlargement, the United Kingdom and France actively in favour, and Italy, Germany, Russia and Canada are reserved on the issue..

Current leaders
(The following list is in alphabetical order by nation)

See also

Avoiding Dangerous Climate Change
Gleneagles Dialogue
List of country groupings
List of multilateral free-trade agreements

Notes

References

International climate change organizations
Organizations established in 2005
Organizations disestablished in 2014
G7 summits